Sébastien Tellier (born 22 February 1975) is a French singer, songwriter and multi-instrumentalist. He represented France in the Eurovision Song Contest 2008 with his song "Divine". He has also produced songs for Dita Von Teese and composed music for the French films Narco and Steak, among others. Tellier is currently signed to Record Makers, a French independent record label. He sings in English, French and Italian.

Biography
Tellier's first album, L'incroyable Vérité (The Incredible Truth), was released in 2001. Tellier went on tour with Air in support of the album and was joined on stage by theremin player Pamelia Kurstin. L'incroyable Vérité is a pop album featuring styles from lo-fi electronica to bizarre cabaret tunes.

The same year, he appears, alongside Vincent Belorgey (Kavinsky) in Nonfilm, directed by Quentin Dupieux.

His second studio album, Politics, released on 31 January 2004. Politics included the popular song "La Ritournelle", a string-led tune with Nigerian drummer Tony Allen.

The same year, he composed the soundtrack for the film Narco, directed by Tristan Aurouet and Gilles Lellouche. The soundtrack released two years later, on 9 November 2007.

Since the release of Politics, Tellier has also recorded an acoustic album of his more popular songs, Sessions (2006). The album was repackaged for the British market as Universe (2006), to include both highlights from the French CD, as well as compositions from Tellier's score for the film Narco. This compilation included a cover of "La Dolce Vita", a song originally by French singer Christophe.

In 2007, he composed a few songs with Mr. Oizo, for the soundtrack of the film Steak, directed by Quentin Dupieux (Mr. Oizo himself). Also co-composed by SebastiAn, the soundtrack was released by Ed Banger and Because Music the same year. Tellier also appears in the film as Prisme, the man with the electric wheelchair.

His third studio album Sexuality was produced by Guy-Manuel de Homem-Christo of Daft Punk. Like his previous album Politics, Tellier used a single term as title and theme of the album. Tellier's label Record Makers collaborated with retailer American Apparel for an exclusive three-month pre-release of the album, whilst American Apparel sold limited edition versions of the Sexuality CD, LP and "Divine" 7" and 12" single through their North American stores and website.

On 7 March 2008, it was announced by Bruno Berberes, head of EBU delegation in France, that Tellier would represent France in the Eurovision Song Contest 2008. It was held in Belgrade on 24 May 2008. Tellier sang "Divine". This was the first time in the history of the contest that the nominated French entry was to be performed largely in English, which caused controversy, leading to Tellier pledging to increase the amount of French in the song prior to the competition itself. In total, the entry received 47 points.

His fourth album My God Is Blue was released in 23 April 2012. As the name suggests, the concept of this album is religion. Tellier is presented in this album as a guru, founder of a fictional sect called "Alliance Bleue". The album is entirely produced by Mr Flash and Pavle Kovacevic.

His fifth album Confection was released in October 2013. This was partially inspired by the death of Tellier's grandmother. Some of the music on the album was intended to appear on a film soundtrack, but ended up not being used. In an interview with artistxite, Tellier noted: "You can say my grandmother's death as well as this nonexisting soundtrack had an impact on “Confection“. To me this has been a super strange situation. I was full of love for my grandmother and full of dedication to this soundtrack; Confection is the result of both of these emotional conditions." In Spring 2014, Tellier performed a medley of tracks from Confection at the Chanel Haute Couture show at the Grand Palais. Tellier recounts that Karl Lagerfeld invited him to perform, having listened to the album himself.

His sixth album L'Aventura, was released on 14 July 2014. The album was inspired by the childhood and Brazil, where the video to its lead single, "L'Adulte", is set. This album, consisting of 10 tracks, is sung entirely in French.

In 2016, he composed soundtracks for the two French films Saint-Amour, directed by Benoît Delépine and Gustave Kervern, and Marie et les naufragés, directed by Sébastien Betbeder. The same year, he composed the music for the credits of the comedy show broadcast on Canal+, Groland Le Zapoï. The next year, he composed the soundtrack for the series A Girl Is a Gun.

In 2018, Tellier composed all the songs from the eponymous album by Dita Von Teese.

In 2020, Tellier returned with a new single "A Ballet", released on 29 January, to promote his seventh album Domesticated, consisting of 8 tracks, which released on 29 May 2020. On 8 April, "Domestic Tasks", the second single released and "Stuck in a Summer Love" the third single on 19 May. The concept on this album is domestic life and this concept was born following his marriage and the birth of his two children. The album is produced by Corentin "nit" Kerdraon, Mind Gamers (John Carroll Kirby and Daniel Stricker), Jam City, Varnish La Piscine and Philippe Zdar (who died in 2019). Apart from this album, on 14 February 2020, he appeared as a featured artist on "Boycycle" by Salvatore Ganacci.

The same year, he released an album titled Simple Mind, in which he covered several tracks from his previous albums, Sexuality, My God Is Blue, L'Aventura and Domesticated.

Use of Tellier's songs
 The track "Fantino" from L'incroyable Vérité was chosen by Sofia Coppola for the soundtrack to her 2003 film Lost in Translation. Coppola also used the song "Look" from his Sexuality album in her 2010 film Somewhere
 The songs "Look" and "La Ritournelle" were featured in Ugly Betty's episodes "Crush'd" and "Dressed for success", respectively.
 "La Ritournelle" also featured in Joachim Trier's Oslo, 31 August movie soundtrack.
 The song "Universe" from the album L'incroyable Vérité is featured in the film Daft Punk's Electroma.
 "Divine" (as remixed by Danger) was used in the 2009 racing game Gran Turismo for the PSP.
 "La Ritournelle" is sampled in The Weeknd's single, "Kiss Land"
 "La Ritournelle" is the first of many final soundtracks used in the movie One Way (2006).
 "Slow Lynch" was used by Top Gear in Seasons 13 Episode 3 (Ken Block's Airfield Rally Run).

Personal life
Tellier is married to Amandine de la Richardière with whom he has two children.

Discography

Studio albums

Soundtracks

Compilations

Other contributions

Singles

Other appearances

References

External links

Official website 
Anthem interview with Sebastian Tellier, on Anthemmagazine.com

Photos of Tellier Performing in Philadelphia, April 2009, on Phrequency.com
Sebastian Tellier, on Soundcloud

1975 births
Living people
People from Le Plessis-Bouchard
French pop singers
French singer-songwriters
French electronic musicians
English-language singers from France
Synth-pop singers
New wave musicians
21st-century French singers
21st-century French male singers
Eurovision Song Contest entrants for France
Eurovision Song Contest entrants of 2008
French male singer-songwriters